El Campo is a city in Wharton County, Texas, United States. The population was 12,350 at the 2020 Census, making it the largest city in Wharton County.

Geography
According to the United States Census Bureau, the city has a total area of 7.5 square miles (19.3 km), all of it land.

Demographics

As of the 2020 United States census, there were 12,350 people, 4,197 households, and 3,067 families residing in the city.

As of the census of 2010, Population in April 2013: 11,486 residing in the city. Population change since 2010: –1.0% 
 Males: 48%
 Females: 52%
 Median resident age:   34.1 years 
 Texas median age:   32.3 years
 
The population density was 1,400 people per square mile. There were 4,491 housing units at an average density of 577.5 per square mile (222.9/km). The racial makeup of the city was 76.1% White, 10.9% African American, 0.33% Native American, 0.5% Asian, 0.01% Pacific Islander, 16.66% from other races, and 1.77% from two or more races. Hispanic or Latino of any race were 47.0% of the population.

Of the 3,916 households 37.3% had children under the age of 18 living with them, 53.1% were married couples living together, 13.5% had a female householder with no husband present, and 28.5% were non-families. 25.8% of households were one person and 14.4% were one person aged 65 or older. The average household size was 2.91 and the average family size was 3.31.

The age distribution was 29.3% under the age of 18, 9.5% from 18 to 24, 26.2% from 25 to 44, 19.4% from 45 to 64, and 14.2% 65 or older. The median age was 34 years. For every 100 females, there were 92.0 males. For every 100 females age 18 and over, there were 86.8 males.

The median household income was $40,698. Males had a median income of $27,416 versus $18,872 for females. The per capita income for the city was $14,464. About 16.5% of families and 23.6% of the population were below the poverty line.

Education
Education in the city of El Campo is provided by the El Campo Independent School District and a number of private schools.

Transportation
The Colorado Valley Transit Authority operates bus services within El Campo and to    Wharton. El Campo is accessible by road by Texas State Highway 71 and U.S. Route 59.

Notable people

 Raul (Roy) Benavidez, Medal of Honor recipient; was raised in El Campo from the age of 7
 Gene Cernan, Astronaut; lived in El Campo
 Jeff Barosh, Texas-based country music singer-songwriter; professionally known as Jeff Chance was born and raised in El Campo. He died in El Campo in 2008 at the age of 53
 Joey Hunt, NFL Player for the Seattle Seahawks
 Chris Mazelle, Dance vocalist; lived in El Campo
 Memo Rodriguez, MLS Player for the Houston Dynamo; born in Wharton and raised in El Campo
 Charles Swindoll, Dallas-based radio minister; was born in El Campo
 Ken Weaver, Musician; was raised in El Campo

Climate
The climate in this area is characterized by hot, humid summers and generally mild to cool winters.  According to the Köppen climate classification system, El Campo has a humid subtropical climate, Cfa on climate maps.

References

External links

 City of El Campo
 City Development Corporation of El Campo, Texas
 El Campo Chamber of Commerce
 El Campo City Data
 
 El Campo Museum of Natural History

Cities in Texas
Cities in Wharton County, Texas
Micropolitan areas of Texas